David Kaye Lee Earl was Dean of Ferns from 1979 until 1994.

Earl was born in 1928, educated  at Trinity College, Dublin and ordained in 1956. After a curacy at Chapelizod he held incumbencies at Rathkeale and  Killarney until his appointment as Dean.

Notes

1928 births
Alumni of Trinity College Dublin
Deans of Ferns
Living people